{{Album ratings
| rev1 = Allmusic
| rev1Score = <ref name="allmusicrev">{{AllMusic |class=album |id=punishment-in-capitals-mw0000325961 |label=Napalm Death: Punishment in Capitals |first=John |last=Serba |accessdate=21 October 2014}}</ref>
| rev2 = Blabbermouth| rev2Score = 8.5/10
| rev3 = The Metal Forge| rev3Score = 8/10
| noprose = yes
}}Punishment in Capitals'' is a live CD and DVD-release by the band Napalm Death. It was recorded at the London ULU on 12 April 2002 at a benefit gig for animal rights organization Stop Huntingdon Animal Cruelty. This is the last release with Jesse Pintado.

Track listing

DVD extras

Video of the London ULU show
45 minute documentary/interview with Napalm Death
Video of "If the Truth Be Known" in the Harmony Corruption sessions
Tokyo, Japan (5 August 1996)
My Own Worst Enemy
More Than Meets the Eye
Note: this is a short video of Bootlegged in Japan

Santiago, Chile (19 October 1997)
Discordance
I Abstain
Unchallenged Hate
Greed Killing
Suffer the Children
Mass Appeal Madness

Credits
Mark "Barney" Greenway - lead vocals
Jesse Pintado - lead guitar
Mitch Harris - rhythm guitar, backing vocals
Shane Embury - bass
Danny Herrera - drums

References

Napalm Death live albums
Napalm Death video albums
2002 video albums
Live video albums
2002 live albums